The 2021 Albanian Cup Final was a football match which was played on 31 May 2021 to decide the winner of the 2020–21 Albanian Cup, the 69th edition of Albanian Cup. The match was played between Skënderbeu and Vllaznia at the Arena Kombëtare in Tirana. Vllaznia won the match 1–0 to earn their seventh Albanian Cup title.

Match

Details

References

Cup Final
2021
Albanian Cup
Sports competitions in Tirana
Albanian Cup Final, 2021
Albanian Cup Final, 2021